CSKA Moscow was a Russian bandy club which was a department of CSKA Moscow. It won the Soviet national championship in 1954, 1955 and 1957. The bandy department was established in 1936 and disbanded in 1962.

Honours

Domestic
 Soviet Champions:
 Winners (3): 1954, 1955, 1957
 Runners-up (4): 1956, 1958, 1960, 1962
 Soviet Cup:
 Winners (3): 1939, 1945, 1946

Bandy clubs in the Soviet Union
Bandy clubs established in 1936
Bandy clubs disestablished in 1962
Defunct bandy clubs
1936 establishments in Russia
1962 disestablishments in Russia
CSKA Moscow